Boothill Brigade is a 1937 American Western film directed by Sam Newfield and written by George H. Plympton. The film stars Johnny Mack Brown, Claire Rochelle, Dick Curtis, Horace Murphy, Frank LaRue and Ed Cassidy. The film was released on August 2, 1937, by Republic Pictures.

Plot
Lon discovers that his best girl's rancher father has bought up the whole valley and plans on evicting all the previous residents who believe they have squatter's rights to remain. Lon is desperate to keep the squatters from resorting to violence to sort things out.

Cast  
Johnny Mack Brown as Lon Cardigan
Claire Rochelle as Bobby Reynolds
Dick Curtis as Bull Berke
Horace Murphy as Calico Haynes
Frank LaRue as Jeff Reynolds
Ed Cassidy as John Porter
Bobby Nelson as Tug Murdock
Frank Ball as Murdock
Steve Clark as Rancher Holbrook 
Frank Ellis as Rancher Brown

References

External links 
 

1937 films
American Western (genre) films
1937 Western (genre) films
Republic Pictures films
Films directed by Sam Newfield
American black-and-white films
Films with screenplays by George H. Plympton
1930s English-language films
1930s American films